United Theological College may refer to

United Theological College, Aberystwyth
United Theological College, Bangalore
United Theological College of the West Indies
United Theological College (Montreal), a theological college of the United Church of Canada
United Theological College (Sydney), the theological college of the Uniting Church in Australia, Synod of New South Wales and the ACT

See also
United Theological Seminary (Trotwood, Ohio)
United Theological Seminary of the Twin Cities
Union Theological College (Belfast)
United Faculty of Theology (Melbourne)